Arthurfest was a festival created by Arthur magazine editor Jay Babcock on September 4–5, 2005 at Barnsdall Park overlooking the City of Los Angeles, CA.

Sunday Sept 4

Lawn Stage
Sonic Youth, Sleater-Kinney, The Black Keys, Sunburned Hand of the Man, Wolfmother, Radar Bros., The Night Porter

Pine Stage
T-Model Ford, Josephine Foster, Lavender Diamond, Winter Flowers, Viking Moses, Nora Keyes, Dos

Barsdall Gallery Theater
Brightblack Morning Light, Merzbow, Pole, Six Organs of Admittance, Magik Markers, Circle, Residual Echoes, Geronimo

Monday Sept 5

Lawn Stage
Yoko Ono, Spoon, The Juan Maclean, Comets on Fire, The Olivia Tremor Control, Dead Meadow, Future Pigeon

Pine Stage
Cat Power, Devendra Banhart, Vetiver, Marissa Nadler, Jack Rose, Young Jazz Giants

Barnsdall Gallery Theater
Sunn O))), Growing, Earth, Brad Laner, Modey Lemon, Fatso Jetson, Time Flys

References
Arcane Candy review and photos of Arthurfest
Dusted Magazine review of Arthurfest
Pitchfork review of Arthurfest
Ice Cream Man review and photos of Arthurfest

Music festivals in Los Angeles